Siliguri Government Polytechnic , is a government polytechnic located in Siliguri,  Darjeeling district, West Bengal.

About college
This polytechnic is affiliated to the West Bengal State Council of Technical Education,  and recognised by AICTE, New Delhi. This polytechnic offers diploma courses in Architecture, Electrical, Electronics and Telecommunication, Electronics & Instrumentation, Computer Science & Technology, Pharmacy  and Civil Engineering.

See also

References

External links
Official website WBSCTE
 Admission to Polytechnics in West Bengal for Academic Session 2006-2007
http://sgpolytechnic.org/index.html#

Universities and colleges in Darjeeling district
Educational institutions established in 1995
1995 establishments in West Bengal
Technical universities and colleges in West Bengal